Hameh Kasi (also Romanized as Hameh Kasī; also known as Gardaneh-ye Hameh Kasī and Hamakasī) is a village in Salehabad Rural District, Salehabad District, Bahar County, Hamadan Province, Iran. At the 2006 census, its population was 2,436, in 574 families.

References 

Populated places in Bahar County